Maio or MAIO can refer to:

Places:
 Maio, Cape Verde, an island in Cape Verde
 Battle of Maio, fought between British and French naval forces in 1814
 Vila do Maio, the main urban settlement on the island
 Maio, Guinea-Bissau, one of the Bissagos Islands of Guinea-Bissau
 Maio River, in Chile's Santiago Metropolitan Region
   

People:
 Maio of Bari (died 1160), Sicilian admiral and statesman
 Giovan Tomaso di Maio (c. 1490-after 1548), Italian composer
 Giuseppe de Majo or di Maio (1697–1771), Italian composer and organist
 José Rodrigues Maio (1817-1884), Portuguese lifeguard and fisherman
 Luigi Di Maio (born 1986), Italian politician
 Marcello Maio, Australian jazz pianist and composer
 Paolo de Maio (1703-1784), Italian painter
 Roberto Di Maio (born 1982), Italian footballer
 Sebastian De Maio (born 1987), Italian-French footballer
 Vincent Di Maio, American pathologist

MAIO:
 Mobile Allocation Index Offset, in GSM